Ivó Giner (born 21 June 1976) is a Spanish professional golfer who played on the European Tour.

Career
Giner represented Spain in the Eisenhower Trophy in 1994 and again in 1996, when he secured a third-place finish together with Sergio García, José Manuel Lara and Álvaro Salto. In 1996 he won the Spanish International Youth Championship, a year after losing a playoff against Cea and García in the Spanish Amateur Championship.
 
Giner turned professional in November 1996 and joined the Challenge Tour, where he had immediate success winning the 1997 Open dei Tessali. Had played on the European Tour in 1998 and 2000 but lost his card at the end of the 2000 season and did not manage to come through the Challenge Tour Rankings or the Qualifying School in either 2001 or 2002. Winning both the Open des Volcans Challenge de France and the Golf Padova Terme Euganee International Open  on the Challenge Tour in July 2003 meant that he regained his playing privileges for the European Tour, where he played 2004 and 2005.

The closest Giner came to winning on the European Tour was at the 2002 Madeira Island Open. He led the tournament after the third round but finished runner-up, one stroke behind Diego Borrego, after bogeying the final hole.

Record rounds
His score of −29 (63-68-64-64=259) at the 2003 Padova Open equaled the European Tour record of a total of 29 under par set by Ernie Els at the 2003 Johnnie Walker Classic.

Giner shot a stunning 11 under par 60 in the second round of the 2005 Madrid Open, equaling the European Tour record at the time. After a 32 at the turn, he raced home in just 28 with an eagle and seven birdies. He needed to birdie the last two holes for 59 but left a 14-foot attempt just short on the 17th, before making a 12-footer on the final hole. Due to the use of preferred lies at Club de Campo, Giner's score does not officially count as a record equaling effort.

Amateur wins
 1995 Spanish Amateur Championship
 1996 Spanish Youth Championship
Source:

Professional wins (4)

Challenge Tour wins (3)

French Tour wins (1)

Team appearances
Amateur
European Youths' Team Championship (representing Spain): 1996
Eisenhower Trophy (representing Spain): 1994, 1996

References

External links

Spanish male golfers
European Tour golfers
Sportspeople from Barcelona
1976 births
Living people
20th-century Spanish people
21st-century Spanish people